Kukandeh (also Romanized as Kūkandeh) is a village in Hasan Reza Rural District, in the Central District of Juybar County, Mazandaran Province, Iran. At the 2006 census, its population was 611, in 151 families.

References 

Populated places in Juybar County